Alor is an American luxury jewelry, watch and lifestyle brand designing and creating expensive cable pieces. It is headquartered in San Diego, California.

History
Alor was founded in 1979 in California by Jack and Sandy Zemer. Jack is a former nuclear engineer at General Electric. Alor was named by combining the first names of the couple’s sons, Tal and Ori, who are now both Principals and Presidents of the company. Alor first publicly displayed its nautical cable motif jewelry in the early 1980s.

From 1970 to 1992, Alor sold stainless steel cable, 18-karat gold and diamond jewelry under the "Alor" name.

In 1992, Alor began a partnership with Phillipe Charriol International and formed Charriol USA. While ALOR International Ltd. remained the parent company, all Alor jewelry designs were sold throughout and U.S. and the Caribbean as Charriol USA. The partnership ended in early 2014, with ALOR International Ltd. reverting to their original brand name of Alor. For the rebranding, the company released a national advertising campaign featuring model Noot Seear and photographed by Justin Coit.

International expansion began in 2012, and now Alor sells to retailers in Dubai, Israel, Kazakhstan, Mexico and Australia.

In 2013, Ori and Tal Zemer launched Alor Swiss Watches, featuring details such as stainless steel cable bands and 18-karat gold and diamond embellishments.

In 2015, Alor released its Black Label jewelry collection.  The Black Label pieces are made in 18-karat gold and feature overlapping circles and ovals set with rubies and black, colorless, and canary diamonds.

In 2017, ALOR partnered with EMA Jewelry to launch a bridal collection called Down the Aisle. EMA will handle distribution and sales as Alor’s global licensee. 
In addition to Down The Aisle, ALOR will partner with Diamond Foundry to bring a fully lab grown designer collection of bridal rings to the market place, called ALOR EcoEarth. ALOR and EMA have also teamed with the non-profit organization 1% For the Planet to donate a portion of all proceeds back to preserving the precious resources of our planet.

Partnership with Campowerment
From November 2013 through 2014, Alor was the exclusive watch and jewelry sponsor for the women’s leadership and revitalization overnight camp, Campowerment. As sponsors, Alor gave the "camper of the day" a watch from their Swiss watch collection. Alor also provided relaxation lounges at all camp sessions, as well as scholarships to attend other Campowerment retreats.

Advertising campaign 
In 2015, Alor unveiled a new advertising campaign. In a departure from past campaigns featuring models or other high-profile faces, its cable jewelry was the sole focus in new ads.

References 

Jewelry companies of the United States
Luxury brands
Companies based in San Diego
Manufacturing companies established in 1979
Watch brands
1979 establishments in California